Piezocera is a genus of beetles in the family Cerambycidae, containing the following species:

 Piezocera advena Martins, 1976
 Piezocera aenea (Bates, 1867)
 Piezocera araujosilvai Melzer, 1935
 Piezocera ataxia Martins, 1976
 Piezocera bivittata Audinet-Serville, 1834
 Piezocera costula Martins, 1976
 Piezocera flavipennis (Zajciw, 1970)
 Piezocera gratiosa Lameere, 1893
 Piezocera monochroa Bates, 1885
 Piezocera nodicollis Melzer, 1934
 Piezocera rufula Martins & Galileo, 2010
 Piezocera serraticollis Linell, 1897
 Piezocera silvia Galileo & Martins, 2000

References

Piezocerini